Ben Stevenson (March 20, 1906 – November 14, 1969) was an American football player.  He was elected to the College Football Hall of Fame in 2003.

1906 births
1969 deaths
College Football Hall of Fame inductees
Tuskegee University alumni
Tuskegee Golden Tigers football players